Gymnoscelis argyropasta is a moth in the family Geometridae. It is found in on the St Matthias Islands of Papua New Guinea.

References

Moths described in 1958
Gymnoscelis